Dorothy Razzell was a female athlete who competed for England.

Athletics career
She competed for England in the long jump at the 1934 British Empire Games in London.

References

English female long jumpers
Athletes (track and field) at the 1934 British Empire Games
Commonwealth Games competitors for England